Gamkrelidze is a Georgian surname. Notable people with the surname include:

David Gamkrelidze, Georgian politician
Revaz Gamkrelidze, Georgian mathematician
Tamaz Gamkrelidze, Georgian linguist and orientalist

Georgian-language surnames